Charles W. Russell House is a historic home located at Wheeling, Ohio County, West Virginia. It was built in 1848, and is a -story, four-bay-wide, Greek Revival-style brick dwelling.  It was constructed as an office and residence for attorney Charles W. Russell (1818-1867).  It was part of the military headquarters established at Wheeling during the first winter of the American Civil War.

It was listed on the National Register of Historic Places in 1993. It is located in the East Wheeling Historic District.

References

Houses in Wheeling, West Virginia
Houses on the National Register of Historic Places in West Virginia
Greek Revival houses in West Virginia
Houses completed in 1848
National Register of Historic Places in Wheeling, West Virginia
Individually listed contributing properties to historic districts on the National Register in West Virginia
1848 establishments in Virginia